Raghunathpali (Sl. No.: 11) is a Vidhan Sabha constituency of Sundergarh district, Odisha.
Area of this constituency includes Rourkela Township and six Gram panchayats of Lathikata block.

Elected Members

Eleven elections held during 1974 to 2019. List of members elected from Raghunathpali constituency are:
2019: (11): Subrat Tarai (BJD)
2014: (11): Subrat Tarai (BJD)
2009: (11): Subrat Tarai (BJD)
2004: (140): Halu Mundari (JMM)
2004: (140): Shankar Oram (BJP)
1995: (140): Mansid Ekka (JMM)
1990: (140): Rabi Dehuri (Janata Dal)
1985: (140): Frida Topno (Congress)
1980: (140): Nelson Sorengi (Congress-1)
1977: (140): Rabi Dehuri (Janata Party)
1974: (140): Agapit Lakra (Congress)

2019 Election Result
In 2019 election Biju Janata Dal candidate Subrat Tarai defeated Bharatiya Janata Party candidate Jagabandhu Behera  by 4,684 votes.

2014 Election Result
In 2014 election Biju Janata Dal candidate Subrat Tarai defeated Bharatiya Janata Party candidate Jagabandhu Behera  by 16,041 votes.

2009 Election Result
In 2009 election Biju Janata Dal candidate Subrat Tarai, defeated Indian National Congress candidate Prafulla Kumar Sunyani by a margin of 18,171 votes.

Notes

References

Sundergarh district
Assembly constituencies of Odisha